Luckyhorse Industries is an independent record label and producer of music related artifacts and art, established in Seattle, Washington in 2001 by musician James Bertram. Bertram has played guitar, bass, and keyboards with Lync, Built to Spill, Beck, Red Stars Theory, Pennsy's Electric Workhorses, 764-Hero, and Amy Blaschke. Luckyhorse  works with Modest Mouse, The Fleet Foxes, The Fiery Furnaces, Tiny Vipers, The Cave Singers, Love as Laughter, The Murder City Devils, Minus the Bear, and The Blood Brothers.

Roster
Arthur & Yu
The Blood Brothers
Chris Brokaw
The Cave Singers
Cold Lake
The Electrical Guitar Company
The Fiery Furnaces
Fleet Foxes
Flexions
Frog Eyes
Gold Leaves
Damien Jurado
Love as Laughter/Sam Jayne
Minus the Bear
Modest Mouse
Mudhoney
Murder City Devils
Naomi Punk
Night Canopy/Amy Blaschke
Old Jail by Spencer Moody
Paper Tiger
Past Lives
Red Stars Theory
The Sorts
Tiny Vipers
Triumph of Lethargy
Ugly Casanova
Unnatural Helpers
Vells
Verellen Amplifiers
Whalebones
Winfred E Eye

Discography 
LI019 Triumph of Lethargy, Old Jail CD, 2008
LI018 Tiny Vipers, Empire Prism CD, 2008
LI017 Whalebones, Morning Man CD, 2008 Rcrdlbl.com review, KEXP review
LI016 Tiny Vipers, Tiny Vipers EP CD, 2007 The Oregonian review
LI015 Sam Jayne, The Supernatural Sessions CD, 2005 All Tomorrow's Parties article
LI014 Vells, In the Hours, 7inch, 2004 Fense Post review,
LI013 Amy Blaschke, S/T CD, 2003 Seattle Weekly review, Neumu review
LI012 Winfred E Eye, The Dirt Tier CD & LP, 2003 Village Voice Review, East Bay Express article
LI011 FCS North CD & LP, Vocabulary, 2003 KEXP review
LI010 Vells, Vells EP CD, 2003 Minneapolis City Pages review, Delusions of Adequacy review
LI009 Minus The Bear, Highly Refined Pirates LP, 2002 (CD on Suicide Squeeze Records) Pitchfork review
LI008 The Sorts, Six Plus CD, 2002 (split release with After Hours Japan) Afterhours Magazine
LI007 FCS North, All Mvmnt Brings BONUS 7", 2002 (CD on Pacifico Records)
LI006 FCS North, All Mvmnt Brings LP, 2002 (CD on Pacifico Records) 
LI005 Plan B, Like A Ship Sailing CD & LP, 2002 The Stranger article
LI004 Winfred E. Eye, The Day I Lost My Sea Legs CD & LP, 2002 (UNRELEASED)
LI003 Winfred E Eye, A Bottle, A Dog, Some Milk, A Bottle CD & LP, 2002 SF Weekly review, Pitchfork review
LI002 Love As Laughter, Sea To Shining Sea 2xLP, 2001(CD on Sub Pop Records) Pitchfork review
LI001 The Blood Brothers, Rumors Laid Waste CD,  2001 (vinyl on Sound Virus)  In Music We Trust review, Seattle Times article

Sources 
Seattle Weekly article
West Coast Performer article
Stranger article

External links 
Official site

American independent record labels